Pseudophoxinus is a genus of fish in the family Cyprinidae found in Western Asia.

Species
There are currently 29 recognized species in this genus:
 Pseudophoxinus alii Küçük, 2007 (Pamphylian spring minnow)
 Pseudophoxinus anatolicus (Hankó (hu), 1925) (Anatolian minnow, giant spring minnow)
 Pseudophoxinus antalyae Bogutskaya, 1992 (Antalya spring minnow)
 Pseudophoxinus atropatenus (Derjavin, 1937) (Azerbaijani spring roach, Shirvan roachling)
 Pseudophoxinus battalgilae Bogutskaya, 1997 (Tuz Lake spring minnow, Beysehir minnow)
 Pseudophoxinus burduricus Küçük, Gülle, Güçlü, Çiftçi & Erdoğan, 2013  (Burdur spring minnow)
 Pseudophoxinus callensis (Guichenot, 1850) 
 Pseudophoxinus caralis (Battalgil, 1942)
 Pseudophoxinus crassus (Ladiges (de), 1960) (fat spring minnow)
 Pseudophoxinus drusensis (Pellegrin, 1933) (Drusian spring minnow)
 Pseudophoxinus elizavetae Bogutskaya, Küçük & Atalay, 2006 (Sultan Sazlığı minnow)
 Pseudophoxinus evliyae Freyhof & Özuluğ, 2010  (Lycian spring minnow)
 Pseudophoxinus fahrettini Freyhof & Özuluğ, 2010  (Pisidian spring minnow)
 Pseudophoxinus firati Bogutskaya, Küçük & Atalay, 2006 (Euphrates spring minnow)
 Pseudophoxinus handlirschi (Pietschmann, 1933) (Eğirdir minnow, Handlirsch’s minnow)
 Pseudophoxinus hasani Krupp, 1992 (Marqīyah spring minnow)
 Pseudophoxinus hittitorum Freyhof & Özuluğ, 2010  (Hittitic spring minnow)
 Pseudophoxinus iconii Küçük, Gülle & Güçlü, 2016 
 Pseudophoxinus kervillei (Pellegrin, 1911) (Orontes minnow)
 Pseudophoxinus libani (Lortet, 1883)  (Levantine minnow)
 Pseudophoxinus maeandri (Ladiges (de), 1960) (Apamean spring minnow)
 Pseudophoxinus maeandricus (Ladiges (de), 1960) (Sandıklı spring minnow, Menderes brook minnow)
 Pseudophoxinus mehmeti Ekmekçi, Atalay, Yoğurtçuoğlu, Turan & Küçük, 2015 
 Pseudophoxinus ninae Freyhof & Özuluğ, 2006 (Onaç spring minnow)
 Pseudophoxinus punicus (Pellegrin, 1920)
 Pseudophoxinus sojuchbulagi (Abdurakhmanov, 1950) (Akstafa spring roach)
 Pseudophoxinus syriacus (Lortet, 1883) (Barada spring minnow)
 Pseudophoxinus turani Küçük & Güçlü, 2014  (Turan's minnow)
 Pseudophoxinus zekayi Bogutskaya, Küçük & Atalay, 2006 (Ceyhan spring minnow)
 Pseudophoxinus zeregi (Heckel, 1843) (Levantine spring minnow)

References

 
Cyprinidae genera
Taxa named by Pieter Bleeker
Taxonomy articles created by Polbot